The national flag of Zambia was adopted upon independence on 24 October 1964, by the first Republican President Dr. Kenneth David Kaunda. Before that, Zambia was the British protectorate of Northern Rhodesia and used a defaced Blue Ensign as its flag.

The current flag is used as both national flag and ensign. It is green with an orange-coloured African fish eagle in flight over a rectangular block of three vertical stripes, coloured, from left to right: red, black and orange. The placement of the eagle and block of stripes at the flag's fly is notable as most emblems and devices on flags are placed at centre or at the hoist. Green stands for the nation's lush flora, red for the nation's struggle for freedom, black for the Zambian people, and orange for the land's natural resources and mineral wealth. Additionally, the eagle flying above the coloured stripes is intended to represent the people's ability to rise above the nation's problems.

The Zambian flag was slightly modified in 1996. The shade of green used in the 1964 flag was replaced with brighter and lighter green and the eagle was slightly altered so as to be more like the one used in the Zambian coat of arms.

Design
The design of the national flag of Zambia is described in National Flag and Armorial Ensigns Act of 4 June 1965.

Green with an orange coloured eagle in flight over a rectangular block of three vertical stripes coloured from left to right in red, black and orange; of overall dimensions 3:2; and to the following colour specifications:

"Spectrum Green", British Colour Council Shade reference 100.
"Union Jack Red", British Colour Council Shade reference 210.
"Jet Black", British Colour Council Shade reference 220=)
"Spectrum Orange", British Colour Council Shade reference 57:

Colours

The dark green was adjusted in 1996 to a lighter and brighter green. In 2012 The London Organising Committee of the Olympic and Paralympic Games solicited advice from each participating nation the correct Pantone colours for its flag. Once confirmed, the results were published in a guide. The colours given were:

The colours approximation in other colour spaces are listed below:

Symbolism

The flag's colours and emblems are rich in symbolism. Each of the four colours represents an aspect of Zambia: green for the country's natural resources and vegetation; red for its struggle for freedom; black for its people and orange for its mineral wealth (primarily copper). The eagle is an African fish eagle, which also appears in the national coat of arms and represents the people's ability to rise above the nation's problems.

Flag protocol

By law, the Zambian flag should be flown only between the hours of sunrise and sunset and may be flown:
at buildings or premises owned or occupied by the Government;
at buildings or premises owned or occupied by local government authorities;
at buildings or premises owned or occupied by any statutory board or statutory corporation;
at state-aided schools; 
on any motor car, boat or ship in or by which a Minister of Government is for the time being travelling;
on any ship registered as Zambian.

The flag is not allowed to be flown by any other individual or institution without express written permission from the Minister except on the following occasions:
on the following public holidays, namely: Africa Freedom Day, Heroes Day, Unity Day, and Independence Day; 
on such other days or occasions as the Minister may declare for this purpose.

Historical flags

Company Rule

British Protectorate

Independence

Other flags

Presidential Standard

Air Ensigns

See also 

Coat of arms of Zambia

References

External links 

Flags introduced in 1964
Flag
Flags of Africa
Zambia
Flags displaying animals